The  Greenville Junction Depot  is a historic railway station at Greenville Junction, Maine. The wood frame, one-story building was opened in 1889 with an addition made in 1911. The station is notable for the “witch’s hat” conical roof at one end of the building.  The combined passenger/freight depot was used from 1889 to 1965, when it closed. The building was listed on the National Register of Historic Places in 2017 as the  Canadian Pacific Railway Depot, Greenville Junction, Maine .

References

External links

Railway stations on the National Register of Historic Places in Maine
Railway stations in the United States opened in 1889
Former railway stations in Maine